Sippy cups may refer to:

Sippy cup, a spill-proof drinking cup for toddlers
 The Sippy Cups, a band formed by Alison Faith Levy